Lombardy elected its sixth delegation to the Italian Senate on May 19, 1972. This election was a part of national Italian general election of 1972 even if, according to the Italian Constitution, every senatorial challenge in each Region is a single and independent race.

The election was won by the centrist Christian Democracy, as it happened at national level. Seven Lombard provinces gave a majority or at least a plurality to the winning party, while the agricultural Province of Pavia and Province of Mantua preferred the Italian Communist Party.

Background
This election was quite a copy of the previous one. The Italian Liberal Party was the sole loser, to its left to the Italian Republican Party and to its right to the Italian Social Movement.

Electoral system
The electoral system for the Senate was a strange hybrid which established a form of proportional representation into FPTP-like constituencies. A candidate needed a landslide victory of more than 65% of votes to obtain a direct mandate. All constituencies where this result was not reached entered into an at-large calculation based upon the D'Hondt method to distribute the seats between the parties, and candidates with the best percentages of suffrages inside their party list were elected.

Results

|-
|- bgcolor="#E9E9E9"
!rowspan="1" align="left" valign="top"|Party
!rowspan="1" align="center" valign="top"|votes
!rowspan="1" align="center" valign="top"|votes (%)
!rowspan="1" align="center" valign="top"|seats
!rowspan="1" align="center" valign="top"|swing
|-
!align="left" valign="top"|Christian Democracy
|valign="top"|2,072,474
|valign="top"|41.7
|valign="top"|20
|valign="top"|=
|-
!align="left" valign="top"|Italian Communist Party & PSIUP
|valign="top"|1,219,259
|valign="top"|24.5
|valign="top"|12
|valign="top"|=
|-
!align="left" valign="top"|Italian Socialist Party
|valign="top"|644,694
|valign="top"|13.0
|valign="top"|6
|valign="top"|=
|-
!align="left" valign="top"|Italian Social Movement
|valign="top"|303,850
|valign="top"|6.1
|valign="top"|2
|valign="top"|1
|-
!align="left" valign="top"|Italian Liberal Party
|valign="top"|279,887
|valign="top"|5.6
|valign="top"|2
|valign="top"|2
|-
!align="left" valign="top"|Italian Democratic Socialist Party
|valign="top"|265,518
|valign="top"|5.3
|valign="top"|2
|valign="top"|=
|-
!align="left" valign="top"|Italian Republican Party
|valign="top"|157,535
|valign="top"|3.2
|valign="top"|1
|valign="top"|1
|-
!align="left" valign="top"|Others
|valign="top"|27,876
|valign="top"|0.6
|valign="top"|-
|valign="top"|=
|- bgcolor="#E9E9E9"
!rowspan="1" align="left" valign="top"|Total parties
!rowspan="1" align="right" valign="top"|4,970,693
!rowspan="1" align="right" valign="top"|100.0
!rowspan="1" align="right" valign="top"|45
!rowspan="1" align="right" valign="top"| -
|}

Sources: Italian Ministry of the Interior

Constituencies

|-
|- bgcolor="#E9E9E9"
!align="left" valign="top"|N°
!align="center" valign="top"|Constituency
!align="center" valign="top"|Elected
!align="center" valign="top"|Party
!align="center" valign="top"|Votes %
!align="center" valign="top"|Others
|-
|align="left"|1
|align="left"|Bergamo
|align="left"|Gianbattista Scaglia
|align="left"|Christian Democracy
|align="left"|59.6%
|align="left"|
|-
|align="left"|2
|align="left"|Clusone
|align="left"|Giuseppe Belotti
|align="left"|Christian Democracy
|align="left"|66.6%
|align="left"|
|-
|align="left"|3
|align="left"|Treviglio
|align="left"|Nullo Biaggi
|align="left"|Christian Democracy
|align="left"|60.8%
|align="left"|
|-
|align="left"|4
|align="left"|Brescia
|align="left"|Mino Martinazzoli
|align="left"|Christian Democracy
|align="left"|44.9%
|align="left"|
|-
|align="left"|5
|align="left"|Breno
|align="left"|Giacomo Mazzoli
|align="left"|Christian Democracy
|align="left"|58.1%
|align="left"|
|-
|align="left"|6
|align="left"|Chiari
|align="left"|Faustino Zugno
|align="left"|Christian Democracy
|align="left"|58.0%
|align="left"|
|-
|align="left"|7
|align="left"|Salò
|align="left"|Fabiano De ZanEgidio Ariosto
|align="left"|Christian DemocracyItalian Democratic Socialist Party
|align="left"|49.1%8.3%
|align="left"|
|-
|align="left"|8
|align="left"|Como
|align="left"|Ubaldo De PontiVirginio Bertinelli
|align="left"|Christian DemocracyItalian Democratic Socialist Party
|align="left"|44.0%9.2%
|align="left"|
|-
|align="left"|9
|align="left"|Lecco
|align="left"|Tommaso Morlino
|align="left"|Christian Democracy
|align="left"|52.7%
|align="left"|
|-
|align="left"|10
|align="left"|Cantù
|align="left"|Mario Martinelli
|align="left"|Christian Democracy
|align="left"|51.7%
|align="left"|Carlo Porro (PSDI) 7.2%
|-
|align="left"|11
|align="left"|Cremona
|align="left"|Vincenzo VernaschiGiuseppe GaroliGiuseppe Grossi
|align="left"|Christian DemocracyItalian Communist PartyItalian Socialist Party
|align="left"|39.9%32.0%15.4%
|align="left"|
|-
|align="left"|12
|align="left"|Crema
|align="left"|Narciso Patrini
|align="left"|Christian Democracy
|align="left"|51.2%
|align="left"|
|-
|align="left"|13
|align="left"|Mantua
|align="left"|Tullia Romagnoli
|align="left"|Italian Communist Party (Gsi)
|align="left"|31.9%
|align="left"|Leonello Zenti (DC) 35.7%
|-
|align="left"|14
|align="left"|Ostiglia
|align="left"|Agostino ZavattiniRenato Colombo
|align="left"|Italian Communist PartyItalian Socialist Party
|align="left"|39.3%16.7%
|align="left"|
|-
|align="left"|15
|align="left"|Milan 1
|align="left"|Giorgio BergamascoGiovanni NencioniGiovanni Spadolini
|align="left"|Italian Liberal PartyItalian Social MovementItalian Republican Party
|align="left"|16.1% 14.8%9.0%
|align="left"|
|-
|align="left"|16
|align="left"|Milan 2
|align="left"|Arturo Robba
|align="left"|Italian Liberal Party
|align="left"|14.1%
|align="left"|
|-
|align="left"|17
|align="left"|Milan 3
|align="left"|Giorgio Pisanò
|align="left"|Italian Social Movement
|align="left"|11.9%
|align="left"|
|-
|align="left"|18
|align="left"|Milan 4
|align="left"|None elected
|align="left"|
|align="left"|
|align="left"|
|-
|align="left"|19
|align="left"|Milan 5
|align="left"|Mario Venanzi
|align="left"|Italian Communist Party
|align="left"|27.2%
|align="left"|
|-
|align="left"|20
|align="left"|Milan 6
|align="left"|Lelio Basso
|align="left"|Italian Communist Party (Gsi)
|align="left"|29.5%
|align="left"|
|-
|align="left"|21
|align="left"|Abbiategrasso
|align="left"|Luigi NoèAda Valeria RuhlAgostino Viviani
|align="left"|Christian DemocracyItalian Communist PartyItalian Socialist Party
|align="left"|40.2%29.9%16.9%
|align="left"|
|-
|align="left"|22
|align="left"|Rho
|align="left"|Ettore CalviModesto Merzario
|align="left"|Christian DemocracyItalian Communist Party (PSIUP)
|align="left"|37.7%31.5%
|align="left"|
|-
|align="left"|23
|align="left"|Monza
|align="left"|Vittorio Pozzar
|align="left"|Christian Democracy
|align="left"|41.8%
|align="left"|
|-
|align="left"|24
|align="left"|Vimercate
|align="left"|Giovanni MarcoraGuido Venegoni
|align="left"|Christian DemocracyItalian Communist Party
|align="left"|45.8%25.8%
|align="left"|
|-
|align="left"|25
|align="left"|Lodi
|align="left"|Camillo RipamontiRodolfo Bollini
|align="left"|Christian DemocracyItalian Communist Party
|align="left"|41.6%33.3%
|align="left"|
|-
|align="left"|26
|align="left"|Pavia
|align="left"|Renato Cebrelli
|align="left"|Italian Communist Party
|align="left"|34.2%
|align="left"|
|-
|align="left"|27
|align="left"|Voghera
|align="left"|Giorgio Piovano
|align="left"|Italian Communist Party
|align="left"|31.7%
|align="left"|
|-
|align="left"|28
|align="left"|Vigevano
|align="left"|Armando Cossutta
|align="left"|Italian Communist Party
|align="left"|42.3%
|align="left"|
|-
|align="left"|29
|align="left"|Sondrio
|align="left"|Athos ValsecchiEdoardo Catellani
|align="left"|Christian DemocracyItalian Socialist Party
|align="left"|53.0%18.6%
|align="left"|
|-
|align="left"|30
|align="left"|Varese
|align="left"|Pio AlessandriniPaolo Cavezzali
|align="left"|Christian DemocracyItalian Socialist Party
|align="left"|41.7%15.5%
|align="left"|
|-
|align="left"|31
|align="left"|Busto Arsizio 
|align="left"|'Pierino AzimontiMichele Zuccalà
|align="left"|Christian DemocracyItalian Socialist Party
|align="left"|43.8%15.4%
|align="left"|
|}

Senators with a direct mandate have bold percentages. Please remember that the electoral system was, in the other cases, a form of proportional representation and not a FPTP race: so candidates winning with a simple plurality could have (and usually had) a candidate (usually a Christian democrat) with more votes in their constituency.

Substitutions
Carlo Porro for Cantù (7.2%) replaced Virginio Bertinelli in 1973. Reason: death.
Leonello Zenti for Mantua (35.7%) replaced Faustino Zugno in 1975. Reason: death.

Notes

Elections in Lombardy
1972 elections in Italy